is an Aten asteroid, near-Earth object, and potentially hazardous object in the inner Solar System that makes frequent close approaches to Earth and Venus. On the Earth approach in 2015, it was observed by the Goldstone Solar System Radar and found to be a contact binary with the largest axis approximately 2 kilometers wide, and each lobe about 200–300 meters large. Although  in its current orbit never passes closer than 0.047 AU to Earth, it is listed as a potentially hazardous object because it is large and might pose a threat in the future.

The asteroid is well-observed, having been observed over 2,000 times over a length of over 25 years, and was assigned a numeric designation in August 2004.

July 2015 Earth passage 

On 24 July 2015  came as close as 19 lunar distances to Earth. It was imaged by radar, and shown to be a contact binary, about 2 kilometers (1.2 miles) on its long axis.

See also 
 Contact binary (asteroid)

References

External links 
 PIA19647: Asteroid 1999 JD6 (Radar imaged 25 July 2015)
 Radar Movie of the same
 
 
 

085989
085989
085989
085989
085989
085989
20150725
19990512